Kyrgyz Trans Avia was a charter airline based in Bishkek, Kyrgyzstan. It was on the List of air carriers banned in the European Union.

Fleet
The Kyrgyz Trans Avia fleet consisted of the following aircraft (as of April 2012):
1 Airbus A300B4 (operated for Mahan Air)
1 Airbus A310-300 (operated for Mahan Air)

References

Defunct airlines of Kyrgyzstan
Airlines established in 2009